Andrew Dallas may refer to:

Andrew Dallas (referee) (born 1983), Scottish football referee
Andrew Dallas (footballer) (born 1999), Scottish football player